John Stuebner (born 1967 in Mohnton, Pennsylvania, USA), commonly known by his ring name Dr. Johnny Wildside, is an American professional wrestler who competes primarily in Northeastern and Mid-Atlantic independent promotions. He made his debut in 1990.

Wildside has had stints in the Reading, Pennsylvania-based IWA (Independent Wrestling Alliance) from 1991 to 1994, the RCW (Regional Championship Wrestling) from 1995 to 1997, brief appearances in the York, Pennsylvania-based NCW as late as 1998 and the Reading-based WPW (World Professional Wrestling) from 1999 to 2002.

Wildside is best known for his 3-year run from 1991 to 1993 with the IWCCW (International World Class Championship Wrestling) based in Parsippany, NJ. There, while managed by Nurse Vanessa Feelgood he travelled with the promotion through the New England States. Wildside had an undefeated singles record until his final IWCCW match when he was defeated by Tommy Dreamer, after Nurse Feelgood hit Dr. Wildside with his own bag. 

After leaving the IWCCW the doctor and nurse were reunited and continued to work together. Nurse Feelgood's popularity propelled them into every major wrestling magazine in 1992-1993. The nurse was the only independent manager to be listed in the top 10 managers in every magazine—almost always number 10—and appeared on the cover of Wrestling All Stars in August 1992.

In addition to wrestling as a singles competitor, while in the IWCCW Wildside also formed several successful tag teams with partners such as Man Mountain Mike, the Metal Maniac and, most notably, with his mentor Jimmy Deo. As a tag partner he had memorable feuds with the Sioux War Party and the tag team of Nikolia Volkoff and Cousin Luke. He also formed a tag-team partnership with Kid Extreme (Chio Frost) in the RCW, where they were part of the Bodacious Alliance.

Wildside was trained primarily by Jimmy Deo and his cousin Jeff Grippley, with follow-up training by Bobby Bold Eagle and Ted Petty at Gleason's arena in Brooklyn, NY. Deo Grippley and Wildside would then form a training partnership and open "Deo's Dungeon" Pro-Wrestling Training Center at 405 South 5th Street in Reading, PA in mid 1991. Three years later the training center was sold to Mark and Troy Mest after it was relocated to Wesner Road in Blandon, Pennsylvania and renamed "The Dungeon".

Achievements

International World Class Championship Wrestling
IWCCW Mexican Heavyweight Championship (1 time)
Independent Wrestling Alliance
IWA Heavyweight Championship (1 time)
Regional Championship Wrestling
RCW Tag Team Championship (1 time) – with Kid Extreme never defeated title stripped
Pro Wrestling Illustrated
PWI ranked him in the 500 best singles wrestlers of the PWI 500 – 478 in 1992, 318 in 1993, 418 in 1994

Gallery

References

Sources
Professional wrestling Illustrated (PWI top 500) December 1992, December 1993, December 1994
Professional wrestling Illustrated July 1992 – December 1993
The Wrestler July 1992 – December 1993
Featured Articles or pictures
The Wrestler July 1992
Wrestling Ringside July 1992 – September 1993
Wrestling All Stars July 1992 – September 1993
Wrestling Scrapbook July 1992 – September 1994

American male professional wrestlers
Living people
1967 births
Professional wrestlers from Pennsylvania